Inches of water is a non-SI unit for pressure.  It is also given as inches of water gauge (iwg or in.w.g.), inches water column (inch wc, in. WC, " wc, etc. or just wc or WC), inAq, Aq, or inHO.  The units are conventionally used for measurement of certain pressure differentials such as small pressure differences across an orifice, or in a pipeline or shaft, or before and after a compressor in an HVAC unit.

It is defined as the pressure exerted by a column of water of 1 inch in height at defined conditions. At a temperature of 4 °C (39.2 °F) pure water has its highest density (1000 kg/m3). At that temperature and assuming the standard acceleration of gravity, 1 inAq is approximately 249.082 pascals.

Alternative standard conditions in uncommon usage are 60 °F (15,6 °C), or 68 °F (20 °C), and depends on industry standards rather than on international standards.

Feet of water is an alternative way to specify pressure as height of a water column in United States customary units.

In North America, air and other industrial gases are often measured in inches of water when at low pressure. This is in contrast to inches of mercury or pounds per square inch (psi, lbf/in) for larger pressures. One usage is in the measurement of air ("wind") that supplies a pipe organ and is referred simply as inches. It is also used in natural gas distribution for measuring utilization pressure (U.P., i.e. the residential point of use) which is typically between 6 and 7 inches WC (6~7″ WC) or about 0.25 lbf/in.

1 inAq ≈ 0.036 lbf/in, or 27.7 inAq ≈ 1 lbf/in.

{|
|-
|1 inH2O ||= 249.0889 pascals
|-
|rowspan=7|
|= 2.490889 mbar or hectopascals 
|-
|= 2.54 cmH2O 
|-
|≈ 0.0024583163089 atm
|-
|≈ 1.8683255576724 torr or mmHg 
|-
|≈ 0.0735561243178 inHg 
|-
|≈ 0.0361272905497 lbf/in 
|}

See also
Pressure head
Barometer
Centimetre of water
Millimetre of mercury

References

Units of pressure